Kenneth Burns (born 23 September 1953) is a former Scotland international footballer. The peak of his playing career was Nottingham Forest, with whom he won the 1977–78 Football League title and the FWA Player of the Year award. He also won two European Cups and two Football League Cups.

Playing career
Burns was born in Glasgow and started his career with Rangers as an apprentice, but did not play a senior match for the club.

On being released in 1971, aged 17, he signed for Birmingham City. He arrived at the club as a defender, but was converted to striker after Bob Latchford left in 1974, and won the club's Player of the Year award that same year. He earned the first of his 20 international caps in that role soon afterwards.

After joining Nottingham Forest for £150,000 in 1977, he was converted back into a central defender by Brian Clough and Peter Taylor. He was one of three signings Forest made along with Archie Gemmill and Peter Shilton to add to the promotion-winning squad of the previous season. Burns was both FWA Footballer of the Year and Forest's player of the year in 1977–78 in his defensive role as Forest won the First Division title that season, in their first year after returning to the top flight. They also won that season's Football League Cup with a 1–0 replay victory over Liverpool; Burns collected the trophy as captain deputising for the injured John McGovern. Burns was injured for the final when Forest retained the League Cup the following season.

He was an influential figure in the side's European Cup campaigns over the next three seasons, his defensive partnership with Larry Lloyd instrumental to Forest's victory in the 1979 and 1980 tournaments. He also scored in the second leg of the 1979 UEFA Super Cup final victory against Barcelona. At one time he was renowned for his 'wild man' image and while maintaining an aggressive nature, he also possessed a shrewd football brain and was always likely to score vital goals.

He was Forest's player of the year a second time in 1980–81, his last season at the City Ground.

Leeds United paid Forest a £400,000 fee for Burns. He stayed with the Yorkshire side until 1984, and he was the club player of the year in 1982–83. Burns spent 1984–85 at Derby County, also playing a small number of games on loan at Notts County. His last season in the Football League was in 1985–86 at Barnsley, before a spell at Elfsborg in Sweden.

He went on to represent a string of non-league clubs as player or player-coach, finishing up as assistant manager of Telford United in 1993.

Honours

Nottingham Forest
First Division: 1977–78
League Cup: 1977–78, 1978–79
FA Charity Shield: 1978
European Cup: 1978–79, 1979–80
European Super Cup: 1979

Individual
 Nottingham Forest Player of the Year: 1977–78, 1980–81
 FWA Footballer of the Year: 1977–78

References

External links

1953 births
Living people
Footballers from Glasgow
Scottish footballers
Scotland international footballers
Rangers F.C. players
Birmingham City F.C. players
Nottingham Forest F.C. players
Leeds United F.C. players
Derby County F.C. players
Notts County F.C. players
Barnsley F.C. players
IF Elfsborg players
Ashfield United F.C. players
Stafford Rangers F.C. players
Grantham Town F.C. players
Gainsborough Trinity F.C. players
Willenhall Town F.C. players
Ilkeston Town F.C. (1945) players
1978 FIFA World Cup players
English Football League players
National League (English football) players
Alfreton Town F.C. players
Association football utility players
Scottish expatriate footballers
Scottish expatriate sportspeople in Sweden
Expatriate footballers in Sweden
Sutton Town A.F.C. players
Oakham United F.C. (Nottinghamshire) players
Scotland under-23 international footballers
Association football defenders
Association football forwards
UEFA Champions League winning players
Association football coaches